Metastasis is a genus of minute, salt-tolerant snails with an operculum, aquatic gastropod mollusks, or micromollusks, in the subfamily Ekadantinae  of the family Assimineidae.

Species
 Metassiminea philippinica (O. Boettger, 1887)

References

 Thiele, J. (1927). Über die Schneckenfamilie Assimineidae. Zoologische Jahrbücher. Abteilung für Systematik, Geographie und Biologie der Tiere. 53: 113–146.

External links
 Fukuda H. & Ponder W.F. 2003. Australian freshwater assimineids, with a synopsis of the Recent genus-group taxa of the Assimineidae (Mollusca: Caenogastropoda: Rissooidea). Journal of Natural History, 37: 1977-2032

Assimineidae